A husbandman in England in the Middle Ages and the early modern period was a free tenant farmer, or a small landowner. The social status of a husbandman was below that of a yeoman. The meaning of "husband" in this term is "master of house" rather than "married man". According to anthropologist Charles Partridge, in England "Husbandman is a term denoting not rank but occupation... Knights, esquires, gentlemen and yeomen were also husbandmen if occupied in agriculture, but were never styled husbandmen because of their right to be styled knights, etc. The agriculturist who had no right to be styled knight or esquire or gentleman, and who, not being a forty-shilling freeholder was not a yeoman, was described as husbandman."

It has also been used to mean a practitioner of animal husbandry, or in perhaps more modern language, a rancher.

Origin and etymology
The origin is the verb ‘to husband’ which originally meant ‘till’ or ‘cultivate’.

References

External links
 J.P. Somerville, Social Structure

Agricultural labor
Animal husbandry occupations
English farmers
Feudalism in England
Husbands
Peasants
Ranchers